The following is a list of notable jazz guitar players, including guitarists from related jazz genres such as Western swing, Latin jazz, and jazz fusion. For an article giving a short history, see jazz guitarists.

A

B

C

D

E

F

G

H

I
 Ike Isaacs
 Enver İzmaylov

J

K

L

M

N

O

P

 Remo Palmier
 Jeff Parker
 John Parricelli
 Joe Pass
 Rosa Passos
 Ralph Patt
 Les Paul
 Oscar Peñas
 Jack Petersen
 Reynold Philipsek
 Chico Pinheiro
 John Pisano
 Bill Pitman
 Bucky Pizzarelli
 John Pizzarelli
 Jimmy Ponder
 Kenny Poole
 Baden Powell
 Doc Powell
 Jeanfrançois Prins
 Joe Puma

Q
 Snoozer Quinn

R

S

T

U

V

W

Z
 Attila Zoller

See also

 Jazz guitar
 :Category:Jazz guitarists by genre
 :Category:Jazz guitarists by nationality

References

Guitarists
Jazz